Yuri Mikhailovich Shestakov (born 21 June 1985) is a former Russian professional football player.

Club career
He made his debut for the senior squad of FC Amkar Perm on 5 March 2006 in a Russian Cup game against FC Saturn Ramenskoye. He also appeared 8 days later in the return leg of the same Cup matchup.

He made his Russian Football National League debut for FC Nosta Novotroitsk on 28 March 2007 in a game against FC Terek Grozny.

External links
 
 

1985 births
Sportspeople from Perm, Russia
Living people
Russian footballers
Association football forwards
FC Amkar Perm players
FC Metallurg Lipetsk players
FC Nizhny Novgorod (2007) players
FC Torpedo Miass players
FC Nosta Novotroitsk players